The Pratt Student Center opened in 2013 after a remodeling of the Pratt Gymnasium.  The Pratt Gymnasium was a 600-seat multi-purpose arena in New Castle, Delaware, on the campus of Wilmington University.

It was home to the Wilmington University Wildcats and formerly the home of the Delaware Stars, a basketball team in the USBL.

See also
 Old Customshouse, WU's downtown building

References

Basketball venues in Delaware
Buildings and structures in New Castle County, Delaware
Wilmington Wildcats